McFayden is a surname. Notable people with the surname include:

Brian McFayden (born 1976), American television personality
Lincoln McFayden (born 2002), English footballer
Kendell McFayden (born 1988), American soccer player and coach

See also
McFadden (surname)